Dream Park is a 1981 sci-fi/murder mystery novel written by Larry Niven and Steven Barnes set in a futuristic amusement park of the same name. It was nominated for the 1982 Locus Award
and later expanded into a series of cyberpunk murder mysteries: The Barsoom Project (1989), The California Voodoo Game (1992), and The Moon Maze Game (2011). The books describe a futuristic form of live action role-playing games (LARPs), although the term was not in use when the original novel was published. The novels inspired many LARP groups, notably the International Fantasy Games Society, named after a fictional entity in the book.

Overview
The Dream Park series is set in a near-future Earth, the first book taking place in March 2051. Technology is used to create realistic games in which participants act out the roles of free-willed protagonists in various stories. These are role-playing games and foreshadowed many aspects of modern live action role-playing games.

Many elements of the Dream Park "Games" will be familiar to players of traditional pen-and-paper role playing games, such as Dungeons & Dragons.  The novels are replete with references to dice rolls, character sheets, and experience points . . . although there's no mention of anyone playing pen-and-paper (just video games).  Most of the classic character classes (fighter, mage, thief, and cleric) are still in use, although "engineer" and "scout" are added in.

The most obvious difference between the Games and modern LARP is one of budget and scale.  Most Dream Park Games use massive, elaborately decorated, climate controlled sets, that cover thousands of acres. In one novel, an entire island is created for the game; in another, a crater on the moon is domed and heavily developed. Holograms (and later augmented reality glasses) are used for special effects. The blades on sharp weapons can be removed and replaced with holographic edges; this allows participants to engage in safe combat. A combination of computers and gamemasters monitor events, prompt actors playing non-protagonist parts, and resolve simulated actions. Thus, after a player's character has been repeatedly struck with a holographic sword a computer might determine that he has died. The player will be informed that he should pantomime a death and is removed from play.

Although the Dream Park concept assumes future technology, it is still an expensive proposition. Players pay fees to play the games. In addition, the first game played is both broadcast live and recorded (the game areas and player costumes include numerous cameras and other sensors). The creator of the game takes the recorded footage and edits it into a movie (with enhanced post-production effects) and other media for resale. While the resulting movies are heavily influenced by the game's creator, the actions of the players are unscripted. In this way the books anticipate reality television.

The games in the Dream Park series are heavily regulated. One of the regulatory groups is the International Fantasy Games Society or IFGS. The creator of a game has nearly unlimited power in the game; he could arbitrarily change a game to doom a given player's character to death and eject the player from the game. IFGS existed to protect the interests of players and limit abuse by game creators. One group of fantasy based live action role-playing gamers have taken the IFGS name for their rules and organization.

In each of the novels, the plot moves at multiple levels. The reader is given parallel stories involving the game story itself as the player characters learn the scenario, solve various puzzles and engage in simulated battles with enemies; the players and their real-world relationships with each other and the game organizers; events affecting the venue staff; and usually some kind of out-of-game plot or conspiracy that will impact everyone involved. These are high-stakes games with massive publicity and cutting edge technology, and they are therefore attractive to a variety of criminals.

Plot 

Most Games are reruns, with team after team of players attempting to complete the pre-packaged adventure.  But someone always has to be first – and every player wants to be part of the initial team that beta tests a Game. To have the author/programmer themself serve as the game master, to face surprises no one has seen, even the most jaded of elite players compete fiercely for such a spot.

And "South Seas Treasure Hunt" promises to be a doozy.  The Game Master, Richard Lopez is one of the best authors in the business, while Chester Henderson (team captain of the players) is a living legend . . .and the two hate each other.  Players from around the world have gathered for a chance to play in the biggest grudge match in Gaming history . . .or even just to watch.

And the Game opens with a bang.  Sent to (simulated) Melanesia to retrieve some sort of World War II-era superweapon, dark magic rips Henderson's team out of the sky, forcing them to fight their way across New Guinea.  Demigods, Cargo Cult magicians, and an army of laughing zombies stand between them and victory.

But even as Henderson's team hacks their way through the jungle, the real world threatens the Game.  A multi-million dollar experimental prototype has been stolen from Dream Park R&D, and a guard murdered.  And all the evidence suggests that someone from within the game is responsible.

Caught between the loss of millions from the prototype, and the loss of millions if they stop the Game, the higher-ups hit on an unusual solution.  Alex Griffin, the head of Dream Park security, will go undercover as a player in the Game.  Solve a murder mystery, help a bunch of crazies play dress-up . . . How hard can it be?

Barsoom Project 

The Fimbulwinter Game has a terrible reputation.  Set in (simulated) Northern Alaska, it was supposed to explore Inuit mythology, with players heading off a Lovecraftian cult's efforts to plunge the world into a new ice age. Right up until one of the players accidentally shot several people, when a real gun was mixed in with the props.

As a result, no one has played the Fimbulwinter Game in years.  But some enterprising individuals want to repackage it as a "fat ripper special", the LARP equivalent of a diet and exercise program.  The challenges are re-themed to force the participants to improve their eating habits, and rethink their lifestyle.  And so a team of overweight weekend warriors set off to save the world.

Meanwhile, the rest of Dream Park is closed to the public.  The company is pitching investors on a mission to Mars, and some of the wealthiest people in the world are there to review the proposal (and have the theme park rides all to themselves).

But the "accident" all those years ago was no accident – the gun was deliberately planted there.  An old enemy has returned, lurking among the investors.  Someone who looks at the Barsoom Proposal, and sees only new ways to inflict global terror – and ruin Dream Park in the process.

But that's not the only surprise.  There's also someone among the players who shouldn't be there.  Someone whose life was ruined by the original Fimbulwinter Game.  And you know what they say.

Revenge is a dish best served cold.

California Voodoo Game 

Things have never been better for Dream Park.  The Barsoom Project is in full gear, and promises to be the crowning jewel in the company's corporate crown.  Further, they're hosting this year's LARP "superbowl", where five competing teams will race each other to discover the secrets of an abandoned "post-apocalyptic" arcology, way out in the desert.  The California Voodoo Game promises to be so big, its actually lured some of the best players in the world out of retirement.

Even better, the arcology is scheduled to be re-used as the center of the Barsoom Project, once California Voodoo ends.  Coupled with various tax incentives, the savings promise to be equally astronomical.

Some of the players, though, have more on their mind than just adventuring.  One of the most ruthless and manipulative players ever, Bishop is a living legend, and self-proclaimed cheat at the Game.  Never been caught, though, and bringing him in as one of the five captains ensures even more attention to this year's superbowl.  But is he here to win?  Or something else?  Every interview he gives raises more eyebrows . . .

As the players prowl through the arcology, battling zombies, bargaining with voodoo gods, and befriending giant alien catfish, Alex Griffin's life falls apart.  He's never really recovered from the corruption he unearthed during the South Seas and Fimbulwinter Games, and the broken friendships that followed. Worse, Acacia Garcia (his former flame) is captaining one of the superbowl teams – and she looks amazing.

Then he gets a call from the police.  His current girlfriend (and coworker) has been found murdered in a sleezy love hotel.  And a routine review of her computer records indicate that she was downloading files about California Voodoo, mere hours before her death . . .  Back in the Game, all of the superbowl teams are behaving oddly.

Has "the Bishop" struck again?

Cultural references 
The novels Achilles' Choice and Saturn's Race, also by Niven and Barnes, are set in the 2020s and feature a quick reference to Dream Park technologies. The events of another novel, The Descent of Anansi, by the same authors, are referred to in the latter two books of the Dream Park trilogy.

An antecedent to Dream Park is the 1973 movie Westworld, in which vacationers pay to spend time in one of several historical role-playing "worlds" (including one set in the US Old West).

The (real world) game show, The Crystal Maze, makes an appearance in The California Voodoo Game, with two of the "superbowl" teams challenging each other in a futuristic version as a warm-up for the titular Game.

Theme park
In the mid-1990s a real company (Dream Park Corporation) took the Dream Park name to try to realize many of the ideas in the books. Their stated goal was a large theme park with ongoing minor events in which attendees could participate. They would also run the sort of immersive games described in the books. The company made a number of adjustments for limits to existing technology. Instead of holographic weapons, players had foam-rubber weapons. Plans were to attach sensors to the weapons and players. The sensors would beam information about strikes to computers that would track a simulated health for each character. Players would wear headsets, a radio allowing the computers and game masters to inform players of important status information. A head-up display on the headset would display special effects like a dragon's fiery breath or a magical spell.

The complete theme park was never built, though a fantasy dungeon was created and tested. The company eventually went bankrupt in 1997. The new attraction MagiQuest in Myrtle Beach, South Carolina follows a similar combat-less approach using electronically enhanced wands that interact with objects around the attraction.

Role-playing game
A tabletop role-playing game was also produced under the title Dream Park (making it a role-playing game based on a book about a role-playing game). The book was written by Mike Pondsmith and published by R. Talsorian Games.

Reception
Greg Costikyan reviewed Dream Park in Ares Magazine #11 and commented that "Dream Park is Niven's best novel in a long time. It shows flair and imagination not evident in, for example, The Magic Goes Away; the multi-level plot is more than intriguing enough to hold the reader's attention."

Reviews
Review by Baird Searles (1981) in Isaac Asimov's Science Fiction Magazine, March 16, 1981
Review by Jeff Frane (1981) in Locus, #243 April 1981
Review by Chris Henderson (1981) in Dragon Magazine, August 1981
Review by Spider Robinson (1981) in Analog Science Fiction/Science Fact, August 17, 1981
Review by Debbie Notkin (1981) in Rigel Science Fiction, #2 Fall 1981
Review by Paul McGuire (1982) in Science Fiction Review, Winter 1982
Review by Brian Smith (1982) in Paperback Inferno, Volume 6, Number 3

References

External links

Dream Park (the first novel) at Worlds Without End

Science fiction book series
1981 science fiction novels
1981 American novels
Live-action role-playing games
Fictional companies
Collaborative novels
Novels by Larry Niven
Fiction set in 2051